Thomas "Moose" Dewar (June 10, 1913 – July 23, 1982) was a Canadian ice hockey defenceman. He played in the National Hockey League (NHL) for the New York Rangers.

Dewar was a member of the Saskatoon Quakers who represented Canada at the 1934 World Ice Hockey Championships held in Milan, Italy where they won Gold.

See also
List of Canadian national ice hockey team rosters

References

External links

1913 births
1982 deaths
Canadian ice hockey defencemen
Ice hockey people from Saskatchewan
New York Rangers players
Saskatoon Quakers players